Pragma, an abbreviation for pragmatic, or from the same root, may refer to:

 , the Ancient Greek word; see pragmatism
 Directive (programming), also known as a pragma or pragmat in several programming languages
 #pragma once
 Pragma (love), a model of love
 Pragma (periodical), a 1980's publication for Pick operating system users